Raymond E. Banks (8 November 1918 – 3 August 1996) was an American writer of numerous science fiction novels and short stories. In addition to authorship under his full name, his writings were issued under shorter forms such as "Ray Banks", "Ray E. Banks", "R. E. Banks" as well as under the pen name "Fred Freair".

Bibliography
Never Trust an Intellectual (1953)
Ixtl Igo, Son! (1953)
The Happiness Effect (1953)
This Side Up (1954) (as R. E. Banks)
The Work-Out Planet (1954) (as R. E. Banks)
Christmas Trombone (1954)
Ticket to the Stars (1954)
"The Littlest People" (1954)
Act of Passion (1954)
The Watchers (1954)
"This Side Up" (1954)
Life of a Salesman (1954) (as Fred Freair)
Men of the Ocean (1955) (as R. E. Banks)
The Earthlight Commandos (1955)
Disaster Committee (1955)
The Short Ones (1955)
The Ear-Friend (1955) (as R. E. Banks)
Genus: Little Monster (1955) (as R. E. Banks)
The Critic (1955)
The Instigators (1956) (as R. E. Banks)
"Double Dome" (1957)
Hunt and Strike (1957)
 "Payload" (1957)
Natural Frequency (1959)
More Like Home (1959)
Rabbits to the Moon (1959)
The Twenty Friends of William Shaw (1960)
To Be Continued (1960)
"Transstar" (1960)
The Revenant (1960)
The Happiest Missile (1961)
Buttons (1964)
The Sea-Water Papers (1964)
Deliver the Man! (1966) (as Ray E. Banks)
The City That Loves You (1969) (as Ray Banks)
Walter Perkins Is Here! (1970)
Lust of the Swampmen (novel, as by Ralph Burch, 1978; aka Daryl: Skull Keep of the Primal Clan (1978); aka The Savage Princess (1980))
Lust in Space (novel, as by Ralph Burch, 1978; aka Ultimate Transform (1978, as Ramond Banks); aka The Moon Rapers (1980, as Ramond Banks)
Duplicate Lovers (novel, as Ralph Burch, 1980

References

20th-century American novelists
20th-century American male writers
American male novelists
American science fiction writers
1918 births
1974 deaths
Place of birth missing
Place of death missing
American male short story writers
20th-century American short story writers